The La Salle Explorers women's basketball team is the women's college basketball program representing La Salle University, in Philadelphia, Pennsylvania.

History
As of the 2015–16 season, La Salle has a 655–553 record. The Explorers joined the A10 in 1996 after leaving the Metro Atlantic Athletic Conference in 1992. They were regular season champs of the MAAC in 1987, 1988, 1989, and 1992 (with an appearance in the NCAA Tournament in the first three but not the latter, though they did play in the WNIT). They won the tournament in 1986, which remains their only conference championship.

NCAA tournament results

References

External links